16 (sixteen) is the natural number following 15 and preceding 17. 16 is a composite number, and a square number, being 42 = 4 × 4.

In English speech, the numbers 16 and 60 are sometimes confused, as they sound very similar.

Sixteen is the fourth power of two. For this reason, 16 was used in weighing light objects in several cultures. The British have 16 ounces in one pound; the Chinese used to have 16 liangs in one jin. In old days, weighing was done with a beam balance to make equal splits. It would be easier to split a heap of grains into sixteen equal parts through successive divisions than to split into ten parts. Chinese Taoists did finger computation on the trigrams and hexagrams by counting the finger tips and joints of the fingers with the tip of the thumb. Each hand can count up to 16 in such manner. The Chinese abacus uses two upper beads to represent the 5s and 5 lower beads to represent the 1s, the 7 beads can represent a hexadecimal digit from 0 to 15 in each column.

Mathematics 
Sixteen is an even number and the square of four.
Sixteen is the fourth power of two.
Sixteen is the only integer that equals mn and nm, for some unequal integers m and n (or vice versa). It has this property because . It is also equal to 32 (see tetration).
Sixteen is the base of the hexadecimal number system, which is used extensively in computer science.
It is the first Erdős–Woods number.
There are 16 partially ordered sets with four unlabeled elements.

Science
 The atomic number of sulfur
 Group 16 of the periodic table are the chalcogens

In technology
 In some computer programming languages, the size in bits of certain data types
 16-bit computing
 A 16-bit integer can represent up to 65,536 values.

Religion

Hinduism 
Saint Markandeya is said to have been granted to live to 16 years of age. When he turned sixteen, the god of death, Yama, came to look for him and fastened a noose around the saint. The saint hugged the idol of lord Shiva that he worshipped (which can be still found in the Amritaghateswarar-Abirami Temple in Thirukkadaiyur, Tamil Nadu, India.) As the noose was wrapped around both the saint and lord Shiva, this made the lord angry and he appeared in his fierce form and vanquished the lord of death, causing a brief catastrophe in the world where no one died. Eventually, lord Yama was revived and the saint Markandeya was made immortal to be of age sixteen forever.

Languages

Grammar

In Spanish and Portuguese, 16 is the first compound number (European Portuguese: ,); the numbers 11 (Spanish:) through 15 (Spanish: quince, Portuguese: quinze) have their own names.

Age 16

 Sixteen is the minimum age for being allowed an official beginner's driver's license with parental consent in many U.S. states and in Canada. In Australia, Iceland, New Zealand, Norway, South Africa, and the Isle of Man, it is the age one can begin to get a learner's license.
 A "sweet sixteen" is celebrated by many sixteen-year-old girls in the United States. It is a coming of age celebration that traditionally marks a girl's transition into womanhood.
 16 is the minimum age that one can leave school in many states of the United States and Canada (however, restrictions apply and vary depending on state or province).
 In the United States, sixteen-year-old girls earn the right to privacy laws surrounding OBGYN practices
 In the United States and Canada, 16 is the most common age of sexual consent, as well as the age in the United Kingdom.
 Sixteen is the minimum age to get married with parental consent in many countries, and without parental consent in Scotland.
 Sixteen is the legal drinking age in Germany, Belgium, Switzerland, Austria and Portugal.
 Minimum age at which one can buy, rent, purchase, buy tickets to, or view a 16+ rated film in the Canadian province of Quebec. It is also the minimum age at which one can accompany a minor under-13 while buying, renting, or purchasing tickets to a 13+ rated movie in the province of Quebec.
 Minimum age at which one can donate blood (with parental consent) in many U.S. states
 Minimum age at which one can obtain an adult passport (which lasts ten years) in the United States, United Kingdom, and Australia.
 Minimum age at which one can join the Armed Forces in the United Kingdom.
 Sixteen is the voting age in Argentina, Austria, Brazil, Cuba, Ecuador, the Isle of Man, and Nicaragua.
 Sixteen is the age of majority in Cambodia, Cuba, Kyrgyzstan, and Vietnam.

In sports

Many leagues and tournaments have 16 teams or individual participants, for example:
 FIFA World Cup finals from 1934 through 1978 (although for various reasons, only 15 competed in the 1938 and 1950 finals)
 FIFA World Cup knockout phase since 1986.
 FIFA Women's World Cup finals from 1999 through 2011
 The season-ending playoffs in the NASCAR Cup Series
 The National League of Major League Baseball from 1998 to 2012
In both the NBA and NHL, 16 teams qualify for the respective league playoffs; it is also the number of wins needed to win the title (both leagues have four playoff rounds, with four wins in seven games needed to win each round).

In AFL Women's, the top-level league of women's Australian rules football, each team has 16 players on the field at any given time (as opposed to the 18 of almost all other competitions in the sport, most notably the parent Australian Football League for men).

In other fields

 16 steps make up the average bar of music in a 4/4 musical arrangement. The Roland TR-808, for instance, has 16 buttons that light up representing 16 16th notes making up a drum pattern.
Sixteen, Kentucky, a community in the United States
 King of France (August 1754 – 21 January 1793) Louis XVI of France
 There are 16 ounces in an avoirdupois pound
 There are 16 pawns in a chess set and each player in a chess game starts with sixteen pieces

 The Sixteen is an English choir performing early religious music
In the video game No Man's Sky, 16 is central to the plot as it is the number of minutes before the Atlas simulation resets.
 Sixteen is a Polish band that represented Poland in the 1998 Eurovision Song Contest
 The Cadillac Sixteen
 There are 16 different personality types in the Myers–Briggs classification system
 A note played for one-sixteenth the duration of a whole note is called a sixteenth note or a semiquaver
 In the 16-bit era, 16-bit microprocessor ran 16-bit applications
 Sixteen Kingdoms, part of Chinese history
 The fighter jet, the F-16 Fighting Falcon
 16 mm film was originally an amateur movie format, but is now used by professionals
 "16" is a song by American band Green Day
 The M16 rifle
 The number 16 is the symbol of the Day of solidarity with political prisoners and victims of the Lukashenka regime in Belarus, which is commemorated on 16th of every months by demonstrations and flash mobs worldwide
 A sixteen is a slang term for a verse in a hip hop song, which are often written in 16-bar stanzas.
 Android 16, a fictional character in the Dragon Ball manga and anime series
 The amount of waking hours in a day in an "8 hours of sleep" schedule
 In the story of the Sleeping Beauty to Walt Disney, a spell is placed on the princess Aurora that when she reaches her 16th birthday, she will "prick her finger on the spindle of a spinning wheel and die"
 16 is the number of the French department Charente
 Many bank card numbers are 16 digits long
 There is a No Doubt song titled "Sixteen" on the album Tragic Kingdom
 The metalcore band Demon Hunter has a song titled "Sixteen" on their Storm the Gates of Hell album
 In Belgium, 16 is colloquially used to refer to the Belgian government or Prime Minister, especially in media, because of the official seat of the Belgian federal government being located on 16, rue de la Loi in Brussels. The full address is also sometimes used, in a similar way as 10, Downing Street in England.
 The number of rays in the Vergina Sun, symbol by Philip's Argead dynasty, possible religious symbol representing the Olympian gods.
 There are sixteen petals on the Imperial Seal of Japan.
 There were sixteen lands created by Ahura Mazda, according to Avestan geography, which were then followed by sixteen negative counter-creations of Angra Mainyu.

References

External links

 

Integers